Dhawala Pushpaya ( Translation : White Flower) is a 1994 Sri Lankan Sinhala romantic drama film directed by K.A.W. Perera and produced by Soma Edirisinghe for EAP Films. It stars Vasanthi Chathurani, Ravindra Randeniya and Priyankara Perera in lead roles along with Anjela Seneviratne and Vijaya Nandasiri. Music composed by Gracian Ananda. It is the 1165th Sri Lankan film in the Sinhala cinema.

Plot

Cast
 Vasanthi Chathurani as Soba
 Ravindra Randeniya as Nalin
 Priyankara Perera as Vinod
 Anjela Seneviratne as Brenda
 Vijaya Nandasiri as Pathirana
 Mercy Edirisinghe as Bording owner
 Manike Attanayake as Matron
 Premasiri Kalpage
 Channa Perera - uncredited role

Soundtrack

References

1994 films
1990s Sinhala-language films
Films set in Sri Lanka (1948–present)